Josef Kemr (20 June 1922 – 15 January 1995) was a Czech actor. He starred in the 1969/1970 film Witchhammer under director Otakar Vávra.

Selected filmography 

Lízin let do nebe (1937) - Jula Plichta
Škola základ života (1938) - tercián Vávra
Klapzubova jedenáctka (1938) - Kid Kicking Soccer Ball
Jarka a Věra (1938) - Boy
Druhé mládí (1938)
Malí velcí podvodníci (1938)
Tulák Macoun (1939) - Child
Cesta do hlubin studákovy duse (1939)
Lízino štěstí (1939) - Jula
Bílá jachta ve Splitu (1939)
Studujeme za školou (1939) - Václav Pelísek
To byl český muzikant (1940)
Prosím, pane profesore (1940) - Mysák, student
Poznej svého muže (1940) - Pikolík
Pro kamaráda (1940) - Císník v baru
Rukavička (1941)
Provdám svou ženu (1941) - Poslícek z kvetinárství
Pantáta Bezoušek (1941) - Pepík
Střevíčky slečny Pavlíny (1941)
Městečko na dlani (1942)
Valentin Dobrotivý (1942)
Bláhový sen (1943)
Barbora Hlavsová (1943) - Student (uncredited)
Jarní píseň (1944) - Sklar (uncredited)
Paklíč (1944) - Chlapec na kole (uncredited)
Rozina sebranec (1945) - Sklár
Třináctý revír (1946)
Pancho se žení (1946)
Alena (1947) - Young Man in Street
Portáši (1947)
Nevíte o bytě? (1947) - Bytový optimista
Nikdo nic neví (1947) - Controller
Tři kamarádi (1947) - Delník na silnici
O ševci Matoušovi (1948)
Dravci (1948)
Muzikant (1948)
Návrat domů (1948)
Poesie pouti (1948, Short)
Divá Bára (1949) - Josífek
Zelená knížka (1949) - Thief with a suitcase
Soudný den (1949)
Rodinné trampoty oficiála Tříšky (1949)
Dva ohně (1950) - Karel
V trestném území (1951) - mechanik Jaroslav Horák
Veselý souboj (1951) - Emilek Veselka, laborant
Slepice a kostelník (1951) - Smisek
Štika v rybníce (1951) - Chaloupka
Císařův pekař a pekařův císař (1952) - Alchemist breaking atom lead
Haškovy povídky ze starého mocnářství (1952) - Ucitel
Anna proletářka (1953) - Unhappy Man
Dovolená s Andělem (1953) - Bohous Vyhlídka - joiner
Divotvorný klobouk (1953) - Painter Antonín Strnad
Tajemství krve (1953) - Aggressive Psychiatric Patient
Přicházejí z tmy (1953) - Tomek
Cirkus bude! (1954) - krotitel Jarda Hájek
Frona (1954) - Havranek
Nejlepší člověk (1954) - Cukner
Jan Hus (1955) - Jesek
Hudba z Marsu (1955) - 
Anděl na horách (1955) - Bohous Vyhlídka
Jan Žižka (1956) - Jesek -Student
Oplatky (1955)
Vzorný kinematograf Haška Jaroslava (1956)
Větrná hora (1956) - paleontolog Frantisek Jezek
Vina Vladimíra Olmera (1956) - Koutný - Mirek's brother
Zaostřit, prosím! (1956) - Prehrsle
Dobrý voják Švejk (1957) - 
Tam na konečné (1957) - Mr. Brzobohatý
Schůzka o půl čtvrté (1957, Short) - Frantisek
Poučení (1957, Short) - Husband
Konec jasnovidce (1957, Short) - Karel Vanícek
Páté kolo u vozu (1958) - Petránek - secretary
Kasaři (1958) - pokladník Krumpera
O věcech nadpřirozených (1959) - Psychiatrist #2 (segment "A Halo")
Občan Brych (1959)
Útěk ze stínu (1959) - Kadavý - kupec auta
Hry a sny (1959)
Slečna od vody (1959) - Officer Dvorák
Jak se Franta naučil bát (1959, Short) - Ghost Bonifác
Zpívající pudřenka (1960) - Lojza
Probuzení (1960)
U nás v Mechově (1960) - Cabinet-maker Gustav Veverka
Zkouška pokračuje (1960) - herec Karel Cízek
Zlé pondělí (1960) - Man in Coat
Zlepšovák (1960, Short)
Černá sobota (1961)
Valčík pro milión (1961) - Taxikár
Procesí k Panence (1961) - Josef Houzvickuv syn
Hledá se táta (1961) - 
Tri razy svitá ráno (1961) - 2. Fako - Duro Mrvenica
Pohádka o staré tramvaji (1961) - Básník
Velká cesta (1963) - Tajný
Král Králů (1963) - Psenicka
Tři chlapi v chalupě (1963) - Redaktor
Lucie (1963) - predseda závodního výboru Josef Pastor
Dábelská jízda na kolobezce (1963) - Teacher
Mezi námi zloději (1964) - Paroubek; chairman of JZD
Starci na chmelu (1964) - Chairman of JZD
Drahý zesnulý (1964, TV Short)
Příběh dušičkový (1964, TV Movie) - Chramostejl
Pět hříšníků (1964) - official Bláha
Prípad Barnabáš Kos (1965) - Barnabas Kos
Lov na mamuta (1965) - Professor
Poklad byzantského kupce (1967) - Houska - Kamila's father
Marketa Lazarová (1967) - Kozlík
Lucerna (1967, TV Movie) - Michal, Water Sprite
Noc nevěsty (1967) - Pastor
Jak se zbavit Helenky (1968) - Professor Slavik
Zločin a trik II. (1968, TV Movie)
Šíleně smutná princezna (1968) - Iks
Muž, který stoupl v ceně (1968) - Vrchní úcetní v nicírne
Jarní vody (1968)
Spravedlnost pro Selvina (1968, TV Movie) - Notary
Maratón (1968) - Man with glasses
Bouřka (1968, TV Mini-Series)
Čest a sláva (1968) - Captain
Šest černých dívek aneb Proč zmizel Zajíc (1969) - Kustod
Hříšní lidé města pražského (1969, TV Series) - Ahmer Kanelitopulos
Kladivo na čarodějnice (1970) - Ignác
Zabil jsem Einsteina, pánové (1970) - Professor Hughes
Odvážná slečna (1970) - JUDr. Frantisek Kroupa
Ezop (1970) - filozof Xantos
Žižkův meč (1970, TV Movie)
Tvář pod maskou (1970) - Pepek
Pinocchiova dobrodružství II. (1970, TV Movie)
Čtyři vraždy stačí, drahoušku! (1971) - Zubaty
Babička (1971, TV Movie) - Dohazovac
Touha Sherlocka Holmese (1971) - Timpanist
Kam slunce nechodí (1971, TV Movie) - Dr. Bryza
F. L. Věk (1971, TV Series) - Jindrich
Chléb a písně (1971)
Slaměný klobouk (1972) - Servant Felix
Smrt černého krále (1972) - Franc Florián
Ukradená bitva (1972) - Karl von Lothringen
Tie malé výlety (1972)
 (1973) - Castringius
Chalupáři (1975, TV Series) - Bohous Císar
Prodaná nevěsta (1976) - Indian
Na samotě u lesa (1976) - deda Komárek
Marečku, podejte mi pero! (1976) - Plha
Parta hic (1977) - Hnízdo
Honza málem králem (1977) - Drummer
Náš dědek Josef (1977) - Francek, syn Oujezdského
Talíře nad Velkým Malíkovem (1977) - LU-PU
Hop - a je tu lidoop (1978) - Genie
Proč nevěřit na zázraky (1978) - Dedecek Mráz
Tajemství proutěného košíku (1978, TV Series) - Deda Karas
Od zítřka nečaruji (1978) - (archive footage)
Deváté srdce (1979) - Toncka's Father
Báječní muži s klikou (1979) - Benjamín Furore, Aloisiin otec
Já jsem Stěna smrti (1979) - Jarda Piskácek
Na pytlácké stezce (1979) - Pernikar
Božská Ema (1979) - Dirigent vesnické kapely
AEIOU (1980) - Secret policeman
Paragraf 224 (1980) - ing. Placek
Blázni, vodníci a podvodníci (1981) - Jirousek
Za trnkovým keřem (1981) - Zmiják Pernikár
Opera ve vinici (1981) - Fanos Hrebacka-Mikulecký
Plaché příběhy (1982) - Hlídac Kníze (segment "Modrá chryzantéma")
Dobrá voda (1982, TV Series) - Hanousek
Za humny je drak (1983) - Grandfather Patocka
Vinobraní (1984) - Grandfather dobes
Pasáček z doliny (1985) - Deda
Všichni musí být v pyžamu (1985) - otec Rehor Marsícek
S čerty nejsou žerty (1985) - Count
Osudy dobrého vojáka Svejka (1986) - Flanderka (voice)
Smích se lepí na paty (1987) - 
MÁG (1987)
The Last Butterfly (1991) - Stadler
 (1991) - Dr. Bisenius
Stavení (1991) - Old man
Wolfgang A. Mozart (1991)
Zpověď Dona Juana (1991)
Krvavý román (1993) - Policejní Komisár
V erbu lvice (1994) - Mad monk
Pevnost (1994) - Petrasek
Golet v údolí (1994) - Lejb Fajnermann
 (1995)
Malostranské humoresky (1996) - Dissident writer Kadlus (final film role)

References

External links

Czech male film actors
Czech male stage actors
Czech male television actors
1922 births
1995 deaths
20th-century Czech male actors
Male actors from Prague
Czechoslovak male actors
Recipients of the Thalia Award